Nieć is a surname derived from an Old Polish word meaning "nephew". Notable people with the surname include:
Magdalena Nieć, Polish actress
Jerzy Nieć (born 1964), Polish wrestler

Polish-language surnames